An inflation swap is an agreement between two counterparties to swap fixed rate payments on a notional principal amount for floating rate payments linked to an inflation index, such as the consumer price index.

An inflation swap is the linear form of an inflation derivative, and used to transfer inflation risk from one counterparty to another.

Example
An investor takes out a 5 year loan that is repaid at LIBOR+1%.  He considers this rate as the sum of real LIBOR plus a credit spread (1%) plus a floating inflation component.  He would like to pay real LIBOR, the credit spread, and a fixed rate.  So he enters into an inflation swap agreement where for the next 5 years he is paying a fixed rate on his loan's principal while receiving  year-on-year inflation on the same amount.

See also
Year-on-Year Inflation-Indexed Swap 
Zero-Coupon Inflation-Indexed Swap

References

Inflation
Derivatives (finance)
Swaps (finance)